Prophecy of Merlin (Prophetia Merlini), sometimes called The Prophecy of Ambrosius Merlin concerning the Seven Kings, is a 12th-century poem written in Latin hexameters by John of Cornwall, which he claimed was based or revived from a lost manuscript in the Cornish language. The original manuscript is unique and currently held in a codex at the Vatican Library.

Synopsis
The text is an example of the popular prophetic writings attributed to the sage Merlin, which ascribe to the early bard prophecies relevant to the author's time. In this case the prophecies relate to the struggle between Stephen of Blois and the Empress Matilda, but the poem also contains local Cornish allusions of great interest.

History
The translations were made sometime between 1141 and 1155, at the request of Robert Warelwast, Bishop of Exeter. John of Cornwall undertook to expound the prophecy of Merlin iuxta nostrum Britannicum. He produced a poem of 139 hexameters and prose commentary on the first 105 lines. Less than a third of the verse prophecies come directly from Prophetiae Merlini (c. 1136); the remainder presumably direct translations from Welsh or Cornish.

The manuscript attracted little attention from the scholarly world until 1876 when Whitley Stokes undertook a brief analysis of the Cornish and Welsh vocabulary found in John's marginal commentary. These notes are some of the earliest known writings in the Cornish language.

See also

 Vita Merlini (The life of Merlin) by Geoffrey of Monmouth
 Merlin  by Robert de Boron
 Mouldwarp

References

Further reading
 An dhargan a Verdhin / The prophecy of Merlin, translated by Julyan Holmes. 2nd ed., Kesva an Taves Kernewek / The Cornish Language Board, Gwinear, 2001. . (full parallel English/Cornish text).
 "Cornica" Revue celtique 3, Whitley Stokes (1876–78) (pages 85–86)
Gerallt Gymro a Siôn o Gernyw fel Cyfieithwyr Proffwydoliaethau Myrddin [Gerald of Wales and John of Cornwall as translators of the Prophecies of Myrddin], by Michael J. Curley. Llên Cymru, 15 (1984–86), 23–33.16
John of Cornwall's Prophetia Merlini, Speculum, 57 (1982), 217–49. A French translation of Prophecy (though not of the commentary)
La Prophetia Merlini de Jean de Cornwall, Études celtiques, P. Flobert. (1974), 31–41 (contains discussion of the Brittonic phrases)
Les fragments du texte brittonique de la Prophetia Merlini, L. Fleuriot, pp. 43–56.
 The Political Prophecy in England by Rupert Taylor (1911) (link to book here)

External links
 A New Edition of John of Cornwall's Prophetia Merlini, by Michael J. Curley © 1982 Medieval Academy of America

12th-century Latin books
Arthurian literature in Latin
Cornish-language literature
Cornish folklore
Medieval Cornwall